Asian Forest Cooperation Organization (or AFoCO) is an intergovernmental organization in Asia aiming to strengthen forest cooperation by transforming proven technology and policies into concrete actions in the context of sustainable forest management to address the impact of climate change.

History

Background
The establishment of AFoCO was proposed by the Republic of Korea (ROK) at the ASEAN–Republic of Korea Commemorative Summit in 2009 in Jeju, ROK. The establishment of AFoCO was welcomed by all ASEAN leaders.

ASEAN-ROK Forest Cooperation

As the initial phase of AFoCO, a cooperation mechanism of ASEAN-ROK Forest Cooperation was formalized by the "Agreement between the Governments of the Member States of the Association of Southeast Asian Nations and the ROK on Forest Cooperation" which was signed at the occasion of the 14th ASEAN-ROK Summit on 18 November 2011 in Bali, Indonesia and entered into force on 5 August 2012.

Dialogue for the Establishment of AFoCO
A new dialogue for the establishment of AFoCO under a multilateral platform was formed with invitations to Bhutan, Kazakhstan, Mongolia, and Timor-Leste. This platform covered a wide range of geographical diversity, stretching from coastal islands to glaciated mountains to central Asia deserts. The Agreement on the Establishment of AFoCO (Agreement) was negotiated through six successive dialogues among ASEAN member states, ROK, and prospective members from 2013 to 2015. The Agreement was adopted on 22 September 2015 and entered into force on 27 April 2018.

Objectives 
AFoCO aims to strengthen forest cooperation by transforming proven technology and policies into concrete actions in the context of sustainable forest management to address the impact of climate change.

Parties
As of August 2022, 14 countries have deposited respective instruments and are officially registered as parties to AFoCO, in alphabetical order, Bhutan, Brunei Darussalam, Cambodia, Indonesia, Kazakhstan, Kyrgyzstan, Lao PDR, Mongolia, Myanmar, Philippines, ROK, Thailand, Timor-Leste, and Viet Nam. Two countries, Malaysia and Singapore are participating as observers.

Institutional Arrangements
The institutional arrangement is stipulated in the Agreement on the Establishment of the Asian Forest Cooperation Organization.
Assembly, represented by a senior official on forestry from each party, is the decision making body of the AFoCO.
Secretariat based in Seoul assists the Assembly in the implementation, coordination, monitoring and reporting of activities under AFoCO.

Activities

Areas of Cooperation
AFoCO promotes and undertakes action-oriented projects in the areas, as stipulated in the agreement, include:
promoting sustainable forest management
reversing deforestation and forest degradation
addressing climate change and enhancing forest carbon stocks and supporting initiatives
strengthening capacity and research and development in the forest sector

Capacity Building Programs
Many training courses were conducted to strengthen the capacities of diverse stakeholder groups of the member countries by enhancing knowledge and understanding of forest management and providing greater access to relevant information, skills, and technology. One of the highlights includes the establishment of the Regional Education Training Centre (RETC) in Myanmar. As a part of on-going programs, AFoCO has provided scholarships to MS and PhD students. Government officials from member countries are invited on an annual basis to work at the secretariat office for six to 12 months. Young scientists and researchers are also invited to participate in AFoCO Science and Technology Exchange Partnership (STEP) Program every year.

Sub-regional and Country-Driven Projects
Since 2011, under the umbrella of the ASEAN-ROK partnership in the forestry sector, the organization embarked on sub-regional projects and individual country-driven projects. The programs and projects cover areas ranging from policy support interventions to engaging villagers in forest restoration and rehabilitation activities. Participatory approaches empowering the local communities, and activities on forest fire and disaster management are implemented to contribute to reducing challenges and conflicts faced in the forest sector. Activities are also implemented for local community livelihood, forest restoration, research and development in genetic resources, among others.

AFoCO Secretariat 

The Secretariat of AFoCO administers and coordinates the activities and day-to-day operations of the organization as mandated by the Assembly. The Secretariat is located in Seoul, Republic of Korea. The Secretariat is headed by the Executive Director, in which the position is defined in the Agreement as the chief administrative officer of the organization who is appointed by the Assembly.

See also 
 List of forestry ministries

References

External links
AFoCO Official website
Korea Forest Service
AFoCo, news and information prior to establishment of official website.
Facebook page of AFoCO

Sustainable forest management
International forestry organizations
Intergovernmental environmental organizations
Forestry agencies